Queensland is a 1976 film directed by John Ruane and starring John Flaus and Robert Karl.

Plot
Doug is a factory worker living in Melbourne who dreams of moving from Melbourne to Queensland. He attempts to reconnect with an old flame, Marge, and move to Queensland together.

Cast
John Flaus as Doug
Bob Karl as Aub
Alison Bird as Marge
Tom Broadbridge as Mick

Production
John Ruane says he was inspired by a newspaper article about a slaughterman who killed his de facto wife and then got drunk for two days. He decided to remove the killing aspect, concentrate on the relationship. Ruane:
What we were trying to do then, strangely enough, was trying to imitate Summer of the Seventeenth Doll in reverse and to imitate Midnight Cowboy, a sort of Northcote version of Midnight Cowboy - not the story, but the fact that they were headed for a dream. Their dream was Miami. Our film was obviously about heading to Queensland... It's about a vanishing breed of Australians.
The film was made with money from the Experimental Film and Television Fund while John Ruane was a film student at the Swinburne College of Technology in Melbourne.

Release
The movie was released through the co-operative movement.

References

External links

Queensland at National Film and Sound Archive
Queensland at Oz Movies

Australian thriller drama films
1976 films
1970s English-language films
1970s Australian films